DeepDyve is a commercial website that sells access to scientific and scholarly articles. A user can buy PDFs of individual papers or get a subscription that offers unlimited reading access to papers from publishers in their network, which includes publishers like Wiley, Springer Nature, JAMA, and Wolters Kluwer.

Content

According to DeepDyve's website and other related materials, there are about 150 publishers in the DeepDyve network; notably, this doesn't include Elsevier/Science Direct, which ended its partnership with DeepDyve in April 2020. Some of the publishers are:

 Wiley
 Springer Nature
 Wolters Kluwer
 JAMA
 New England Journal of Medicine
 Oxford University Press
 Cambridge University Press

According to the same sources there are over 25 million articles from more than 15,000 peer-reviewed journals available.

Technology & Features

The current viewing interface (January 2023) for article reading is implemented by rendering the article pages as images on the screen. In addition to viewing the full-text article through a browser, subscribers are prevented from printing more than 20 article pages per month.

Further reading 
 Strategic footstep for content supply in the digital age, September 2015
 DeepDyve Spring Survey of Unaffiliated Users, April 2015
 Next Step in the Evolution of Scientific Information Access: DeepDyve and FIZ Karlsruhe Partner to Offer Document Rental Services to FIZ AutoDoc Clients, February  2014

See also
List of academic databases and search engines

References 
Commercial digital libraries
Academic publishing
American digital libraries